Khvoresh Rostam-e Shomali Rural District is in Khvoresh Rostam District of Khalkhal County, Ardabil province, Iran. At the census of 2006, its population was 4,284 in 1,201 households; there were 3,458 inhabitants in 1,164 households the following census of 2011; and in the most recent census of 2016, the population of the rural district was 3,239 in 1,143 households. The largest of its 34 villages was Kazaj, with 820 people. It is in the Alborz (Elburz) mountain range.

References 

Khalkhal County

Rural Districts of Ardabil Province

Populated places in Ardabil Province

Populated places in Khalkhal County